"Colour the World" is a song by German production group Sash! featuring Nigerian-Swedish recording artist and producer Dr. Alban. It was released in 1999 via Mighty, Club Tools, and Multiply Records as the fourth and final single from the group's second studio album, Life Goes On (1998). It was successful in a number of European countries and reached number 15 on the UK Singles Chart.

Critical reception
A reviewer from Birmingham Evening Mail commented, "Sash has now entered his tribal, luv'ed up phase. Not as good as previous singles but annoyingly catchy."

Track listing

Credits
 Design – Michael Kowalkowski
 Lyrics – Dr. Alban, Ralf Kappmeier, Sascha Lappessen, Thomas Alisson
 Mastering – J. Quincy Kramer
 Music – Ralf Kappmeier, Sascha Lappessen, Thomas Alisson
 Producer – Sash!, Tokapi
 Vocals – Dr. Alban

Charts

Weekly charts

Year-end charts

Lazy Monkeys version

In 2009, the group Lazy Monkeys released a cover version of the song.

Track listing

Other versions
In 1998, a Christmas version of the song saw the light of day, but was officially released on Sash!'s YouTube page in 2016.
In 2020, a rework of the Christmas version was released.

References

External links
 

1999 singles
1998 songs
Dr. Alban songs
Multiply Records singles
Sash! songs
Songs written by Dr. Alban